"Addicted" was the first promotional single to be lifted from Sweetbox's sixth studio album, Addicted. It uses a sample from Vivaldi's The Four Seasons.

It is the only song on the album to have a music video; the video and two remixes (Boom Boom Remix and Pot Black Dirty Mix) are included on the Korean version of the Addicted album, while the video and these two remixes (Boom Boom Remix and Rich Rich Remix) are on the European version of the Addicted album. The Boom Boom Remix can also be found on the remix album Best of 12" Collection; a live version of the song can be heard on the album Live.

Track listing

Notes
The Songs Everything's Gonna Be Alright -Reborn- and Everything's Gonna Be Alright -Reborn- (Classic Mix) features the singer Toby Breitenbach.

References

2006 singles
Sweetbox songs
Songs written by Jade Villalon
2006 songs
Sony BMG singles